Bell Laboratory may refer to:

 Bell Labs, also known as the Bell Laboratories, the large research organization created by American Telephone & Telegraph Company (AT&T) in 1925, or
 Bell Laboratory, also known as the Volta Laboratory and the Alexander Graham Bell Laboratory, created in Washington, D.C. by Alexander Graham Bell in 1880.